The 2012 European Cross Country Championships was the 19th edition of the cross country running competition for European athletes which was held in Szentendre, Hungary on 9 December.

Andrea Lalli of Italy won the men's title to become the country's first ever champion at the competition. The men's team race was won by Spain. Fionnuala Britton was the winner in the senior women's race, becoming the first woman to retain her title. Team Ireland took gold in the senior women's race.

Race results

Senior men

Totals: 92 entrants, 92 starters, 84 finishers, 8 teams.

Senior women

Totals: 54 entrants, 54 starters, 54 finishers, 8 teams.

Under-23 men

Totals: 99 entrants, 99 starters, 94 finishers, 15 teams.

Under-23 women

Totals: 63 entrants, 63 starters, 63 finishers, 6 teams.

Junior men

Totals: 116 entrants, 116 starters, 114 finishers, 19 teams.

Junior women

Totals: 94 entrants, 94 starters, 93 finishers, 16 teams.

Medal table

References 

European Cross Country Championships
European Cross Country Championships
European Cross Country Championships
International athletics competitions hosted by Hungary
Cross country running in Hungary
European Cross Country Championships